Sinosciapus is a genus of flies in the family Dolichopodidae. It is known from China.

Species
 Sinosciapus liuae Yang & Zhu, 2011
 Sinosciapus tianmushanus Yang, 2001
 Sinosciapus yunlonganus Yang & Saigusa, 2001

References 

Dolichopodidae genera
Sciapodinae
Insects of China